The sixth and final season of The Wonder Years aired on ABC from September 23, 1992 to May 12, 1993. This season took place during Kevin Arnold's 1972–73 school year.

Episodes

Fred Savage was present for all episodes
Danica McKellar was present for 19 episodes
Dan Lauria was present for 17 episodes
Jason Hervey was present for 15 episodes
Alley Mills was present for 14 episodes
Josh Saviano was present for 10 episodes
Olivia d'Abo guest stars in the final episode
Recurring guests include Paula Marshall as Bonnie Douglas, Giovanni Ribisi as Jeff Billings, Scott Menville as David "Wart" Wirtshafter, Michael Paul Chan as Mr. Chong, and Lindsay Sloane as Alice Piedermier.

References

1992 American television seasons
1993 American television seasons
The Wonder Years seasons
Television series set in 1972
Television series set in 1973